Lord Arthur Chichester (30 September 1808 – 25 January 1840), was an Anglo-Irish Member of Parliament (MP).

Chichester was the fourth son of George Chichester, 2nd Marquess of Donegall, and Anna, daughter of Sir Edward May, 2nd Baronet. George Chichester, 3rd Marquess of Donegall, Edward Chichester, 4th Marquess of Donegall, and Lord John Chichester were his brothers.

Chichester was returned to Parliament as one of two representatives for Belfast in 1832, a seat he held until 1835. Chichester died in January 1840, aged 31.

References

External links 

1808 births
1840 deaths
Younger sons of marquesses
Arthur
UK MPs 1832–1835
Members of the Parliament of the United Kingdom for Belfast constituencies (1801–1922)